Wojciech Jan Buciarski (born 17 April 1950) is a retired Polish pole vaulter. He competed at the 1972 and 1976 Olympics and finished in tenth and fifth place, respectively. He won a silver medal at the 1975 European Athletics Indoor Championships with a jump of 5.30 m; the same year he set his personal best at 5.50 m.

Buciarski is the father of Piotr Buciarski, an Olympic pole vaulter competing for Denmark, and father-in-law of Rachel Yurkovich, an American javelin thrower. As of 2013 he was living in Denmark and coaching Cathrine Larsåsen, a Norwegian pole vaulter.

International competitions

References

1950 births
Living people
Polish male pole vaulters
Athletes (track and field) at the 1972 Summer Olympics
Athletes (track and field) at the 1976 Summer Olympics
Olympic athletes of Poland
Athletes from Warsaw
Legia Warsaw athletes
Skra Warszawa athletes